Margaritaville at Sea Paradise (formerly Grand Classica, Costa neoClassica, and Costa Classica) is a cruise ship that is operating for Margaritaville at Sea.  The ship left the Costa fleet in March 2018 after being sold to Bahamas Paradise Cruise Line and began sailing on April 13, 2018 as Grand Classica. From May 2022, the ship has been sailing as Margaritaville at Sea Paradise, after the cruise line announced a partnership with Margaritaville Resorts & Hotels.

Costa Classica 

The  contract for the Costa Classica was signed with Fincantieri in July 1987 with a value of $287 million. The ship was built as hull 5877 by Fincantieri Cantieri Navali Italiani yard at Monfalcone, completed in 1991, and was Costa Cruises' first purpose-built newbuild since Eugenio C in 1966. She was the first of two sister ships, the other being Costa Romantica, and was intended for Costa's new Euroluxe concept. The ship interior and exteriors were designed by Italian firm Gregotti Associati. The custom artwork on board was by Arnaldo Pomodoro, Emilio Tadini, Sergio Benvenuti, Isaac Maimon and Augusto Vignali. The ship was topped with Costa's trademark funnels. On board were two restaurants, 9 bars, 2 swimming pools, and 4 whirlpools.

2000 Lengthening refit cancellation 

A major refit of Costa Classica was scheduled to have taken place between November 2000 and early 2001. In the summer of 1999, Costa contracted the United Kingdom shipbuilder Cammell Laird to construct a new 146 ft/44.8m midsection to lengthen the ship to 870 ft/265.4m. The lengthening would also see a refit of the ship's interiors. The new section was constructed and ready for the ship's arrival. However, Costa cancelled the refit when the ship was due to arrive. This contract cancellation was in part responsible for causing the shipbuilder to go into receivership in April 2001. The constructed section that was built was never added to the ship. It was later sold and demolished for scrap.

Refit as Costa neoClassica 

Costa Classica underwent a refit in 2014 to join the Costa neoCollection as the Costa neoClassica. It retained its original design while its sister ship the Costa Romantica  underwent a 90 million refurbishing to become Costa neoRomantica. The sister ship received a complete overhaul which saw an increase in tonnage and additional cabins.

Bahamas Paradise Cruise Lines 

On 2 August 2017, Costa Cruises announced that the vessel had been sold to an unnamed buyer and will leave the Costa Cruises fleet in March 2018. On 13 December 2017, it was revealed that the ship had been purchased by Bahamas Paradise Cruise Line, who would rename the vessel Grand Classica. The ship began sailing out from the Port of Palm Beach starting on 13 April 2018. The ship initially operated 2 day round trip cruises to Freeport, Grand Bahama Island. After the island of Grand Bahama was devastated by Hurricane Dorian in 2019, the ship was rescheduled to operate 2 day round trip cruises to Nassau that began on October 12. The other line's sister ship, the Grand Celebration would continue to sail to Grand Bahama Island. The ship continued to sail to Nassau until March 2020 when the cruise line took the ship out of service for a wet dock renovation and maintenance that was scheduled through May. The ship was expected to return to service in June. During this time, the cruise ship industry was halted due to the COVID-19 pandemic. The ship had remained laid up at Freeport since then. Following the sale of the line's other ship the Grand Celebration in November 2020, the Grand Classica was slated to return to sailing to Freeport as soon as the cruise lines are able to operate. In June 2021, the ship left Freeport and returned to the Port of Palm Beach in preparation for the cruise line's return to service. The ship returned to service on July 24. On September 3rd, it was announced that the ship was chartered for a month long contract to house Entergy workers as they work to restore the power in Louisiana following Hurricane Ida. The ship departed Palm Beach the next day and sailed to New Orleans and arrived on September 7. The ship returned to Palm Beach and resumed service on September 26.

Partnership and rebrand with Margaritaville 
On 8 December 2021, that Bahamas Paradise Cruise Line entered into an agreement/partnership with Margaritaville Resorts & Hotels to operate the brand beginning in April 2022, Bahamas Paradise is still the brand's owner.

Grand Classica was renamed Margaritaville at Sea Paradise and received an extensive refit and rebranding at Grand Bahama Shipyard, Freeport, during April 2022. The ship is continuing to operate its two-night sailings from Port of Palm Beach to Freeport. The line also expects to acquire more ships at a later date. The inaugural sailing was delayed from April until May, with the renovated ship returning to Port of Palm Beach on 10 May and the inaugural cruise taking place four days later.  The ship entered service in mid-May 2022.

Incidents and accidents

MSC Poesia collision 
On June 6, 2008, MSC Poesia and Costa Classica collided in the Adriatic Sea near Dubrovnik, after the anchor line became slack on MSC Poesia and she went adrift. There were no injuries, and the damage was minimal. Both vessels continued on their scheduled itineraries with no delays.

2009 passenger disappearance 
A Hong Kong woman and her son disappeared while on a cruise from Beijing to Fukuoka in July 2009. A source confirmed three letters were found in their cabin concerning the distribution of their belongings. The agency Hong Thai Travel confirmed that the pair were among 35 tourists who boarded the cruise ship in Tianjin and its tour guide realized the pair were missing on 7 July. Costa Crociere said it had reported the incident to law enforcement bodies in Korea, China and Japan.

2010 collision  near Shanghai 
On 18 October 2011, Costa Classica collided with a Belgian-flagged vessel near the deep water channel of the Yangtze River as she returned to Shanghai from Jeju, Korea. Several passengers reported to the infirmary with minor injuries. Three passengers were sent ashore for further medical checks. News images showed a gash along the starboard side of Costa Classica that stretched about 60 feet, and well above the ship's waterline. Costa Classica docked a few hours after the incident and passengers on the current voyage of the ship were disembarked.

Costa Classica then sailed to Changxing, China to undergo an emergency drydock. It took just 96 hours to complete repairs, resuming service afterwards. The next voyage was resumed in Hong Kong on 25 October, two days short, and its Manila port destination was cancelled.

2019 Grand Classica banned from entering Havana, Cuba
Viva Travel, a Florida-based travel agency, chartered Grand Classica for what was advertised as a Valentine's Day cruise to reunite Cuban exiles with their relatives aboard the vessel.  Despite claims by the cruise line and travel agency that they had secured the necessary governmental approvals, the ship was denied entry and diverted to Nassau, Bahamas.

References

External links

Margaritaville at Sea Paradise Website
Video Clip of Costa Classica

1991 ships
Maritime incidents in 2008
Maritime incidents in 2009
Maritime incidents in 2010
Ships of Costa Cruises
Ships built by Fincantieri
Sea Paradise